The Kowhai River is a river of the northeast of New Zealand's South Island. It flows south from the slopes of Manakau in the Seaward Kaikōura Range, turning southeast as it reaches its narrow coastal plain. The Kowhai River flows to the ocean to the west of the Kaikōura Peninsula, three kilometres west of the town of Kaikōura.

See also
List of rivers of New Zealand

References

Kaikōura District
Rivers of Canterbury, New Zealand
Rivers of New Zealand